Christopher DeWayne Green (born September 5, 1960) is an American former professional baseball pitcher.

External links
, or Retrosheet, or Pura Pelota (Venezuelan Winter League)

1960 births
Living people
Alexandria Dukes players
American expatriate baseball players in Canada
Baseball players from Los Angeles
Buffalo Bisons (minor league) players
Charlotte O's players
Edmonton Trappers players
Greenwood Pirates players
Gulf Coast Pirates players
Hawaii Islanders players
Lynn Pirates (1983) players
Major League Baseball pitchers
Navegantes del Magallanes players
American expatriate baseball players in Venezuela
Pittsburgh Pirates players
Rochester Red Wings players
Shelby Pirates players
Tiburones de La Guaira players
Susan Miller Dorsey High School alumni